is a passenger railway station  located in the city of Minamiashigara, Kanagawa Prefecture, Japan, operated by the Izuhakone Railway.

Lines
Tsukahara Station is served by the Daiyūzan Line, and is located 6.3 kilometers from the line’s terminus at Odawara Station.

Station layout
The station consists of a single side platform with a small attached station building. The station is unmanned.

Adjacent stations

History
Tsukahara Station was officially opened on October 15, 1925.

Passenger statistics
In fiscal 2019, the station was used by an average of 1,126 passengers daily (boarding passengers only).

The passenger figures (boarding passengers only) for previous years are as shown below.

Surrounding area
Prefectural Road 74 runs on the west side of the station, and the Karikawa River on the east side. On the opposite bank of Karikawa, there are Minamiashigara City Okamoto Junior High School, Minamiashigara City Okamoto Elementary School, Minamiashigara City Hall Okamoto Branch, and Minamiashigara City Library, which are connected to the station side by a prefectural road bridge. In addition, the Tsukahara Post Office is located near the station.

See also
List of railway stations in Japan

References

External links

Izuhakone Railway home page 

Railway stations in Japan opened in 1925
Izuhakone Daiyuzan Line
Railway stations in Kanagawa Prefecture
Minamiashigara, Kanagawa